Butley may refer to:
Butley, Suffolk, a village in Suffolk, England
Butley River, a tributary of the River Ore in Suffolk, England
Butley (play), a 1971 play by Simon Gray
Butley (film), a 1974 film directed by Harold Pinter based on play Butley
Butley, Butle (Surname), in India, Maharashtra

See also
Butleigh